Passiflora tulae, the mountain love in the mist or pink passionflower, is a plant species in the family Passifloraceae.

It is native to Puerto Rico.

References

tulae